Graham Peak is the fourth highest peak in the Albion Mountains of Idaho, at  above sea level. Forest road 707 leads directly to the summit. The peak contains the smallest of the three known populations of Cymopterus davisii, estimated at 500–1000 individuals.

See also

 List of mountains of Idaho
 List of mountain peaks of Idaho
 List of mountain ranges in Idaho

References 

Mountains of Idaho
Mountains of Cassia County, Idaho